Citrology is the scientific study of citruses. It is an organism-level branch of botany.

Soviet citrology
Citrology was a highly valued field in the Soviet Union, where citrologists regularly grew subtropical plants in temperatures as low as -30°C.

References

Rutaceae
Branches of biology
Branches of botany